Cyanomethia pseudothonalmus is a species of beetle in the family Cerambycidae, the only species in the genus Cyanomethia.

References

Xystrocerini
Monotypic Cerambycidae genera